Linda Dean Campbell  is an American politician from the state of Massachusetts. Since 2007 she has been a member of the Massachusetts House of Representatives representing the  15th  Essex – consisting Precincts 1, 2, 3, 4, 5, 6, 8, 9, 10, 11 and 12 of the town of Methuen, Essex County.

Education
Campbell graduated from St. Mary's High School in Lawrence, Massachusetts and later from the University of Massachusetts Amherst, B.A. and the University of Southern California with her M.A. in International Relations.

Work experience
Prior to her election to the House of Representatives, Campbell worked as a nurses' aid at the Lawrence General Hospital.  From 1979 through 1988 Campbell was a member of the United States Army and served as Chief of Intelligence Processing for the Army's component of the Rapid Deployment Force, XVIIIth Airborne Corps, at Fort Bragg. During her military career, Campbell was a paratrooper with over thirty jumps from military aircraft. During this time she also was stationed in Germany and held positions in personnel and intelligence. From 1988–1990 Campbell was a High School History and English teacher in North Carolina and also taught an undergraduate course in International Relations at Methodist College. In 1999, Campbell was elected as a City Councilor for the City of Methuen where she served for three terms, she then ran for State Representative in the Massachusetts House of Representatives in 2006.

Elections to the Massachusetts House of Representatives
In the districts' 2006 campaign, Campbell defeated Republican Robert A. Andrew and anti-abortion candidate Kenneth A. Henrick, winning 61–28% over Andrew.  In 2008, she defended the seat against Independent Joseph Leone, winning with 70% of the vote.

In 2022, Campbell announced she would not run for re-election after eight terms. She will leave office in January 2023.

Committees on which Campbell serves
Joint Committee on Revenue (Vice-Chair)
Joint Committee on Public Health
Joint Committee on State Administration and Regulatory Oversight
House Committee on Post Audit and Oversight

Related links
Campbell Representative Page

See also
 2019–2020 Massachusetts legislature
 2021–2022 Massachusetts legislature

References

USC School of International Relations alumni
University of Massachusetts Amherst alumni
Democratic Party members of the Massachusetts House of Representatives
Living people
Women state legislators in Massachusetts
People from Methuen, Massachusetts
21st-century American politicians
21st-century American women politicians
Year of birth missing (living people)